The Holocaust in Croatia (2016) is a book by Ivo and Slavko Goldstein, first published as Holokaust u Zagrebu (in Serbo-Croatian) in 2001. It received positive reviews in English-language publications, and was praised for its evenhanded and nuanced approach to controversial subject matter. It was a finalist for the National Jewish Book Award.

References

2016 non-fiction books
History books about the Holocaust
History books about Croatia
2001 non-fiction books
Independent State of Croatia